SWCHA is a homeschool sports organization in Southeast Wisconsin; hence the name: Southeast Wisconsin Christian Homeschool Athletics.

References

External links 
 SWCHA's Athletic Site

Alternative education